Dirk Marten Fortuin (14 July 1901 – 24 November 1986) was a Dutch rower. He competed at the 1924 Summer Olympics in Paris with the men's coxed four where they did not start in the final round.

References

1901 births
1986 deaths
Dutch male rowers
Olympic rowers of the Netherlands
Rowers at the 1924 Summer Olympics
Rowers from Amsterdam
European Rowing Championships medalists
20th-century Dutch people